Mount Edgeworth is a mountain on West Falkland, Falkland Islands. It is northeast of Mount Adam and east of Hill Cove.

References

Edgeworth